The 2016 North Queensland Cowboys season was the 22nd in the club's history and their first as defending premiers. Coached by Paul Green and co-captained by Johnathan Thurston and Matthew Scott, they competed in the NRL's 2016 Telstra Premiership. In the pre-season the Cowboys competed in the 2016 Auckland Nines tournament, reaching the quarter-finals. The team finished the regular season in 4th, losing in the preliminary final to the eventual premiers, the Cronulla Sharks.

Season summary

Milestones
 Round 1: Johnathan Thurston scored his 1,800th point in the NRL.
 Round 3: Lachlan Coote scored his 50th try in the NRL.
 Round 5: Javid Bowen made his NRL debut.
 Round 5: James Tamou played his 150th game for the club.
 Round 5: Javid Bowen scored his first NRL try.
 Round 7: Justin O'Neill played his 100th NRL game.
 Round 7: Johnathan Thurston scored his 1,000th point at 1300SMILES Stadium.
 Round 9: Kane Linnett scored his 50th NRL try.
 Round 10: Ethan Lowe played his 50th game for the club.
 Round 11: Johnathan Thurston played his 250th game for the club.
 Round 12: Jahrome Hughes made his debut for the club.
 Round 12: Jahrome Hughes scored his first NRL try.
 Round 13: Ray Thompson played his 100th game for the club.
 Round 13: Gavin Cooper scored his 50th try for the club.
 Round 14: Jason Taumalolo played his 100th game for the club.
 Round 17: Gavin Cooper played his 150th game for the club.
 Round 18: Josh Chudleigh made his NRL debut.
 Round 18: Josh Chudleigh scored his first NRL try.
 Round 26: Lachlan Coote and Jake Granville played their 50th games for the club.
 Finals Week 1: Ben Hannant played his 50th game for the club.
 Finals Week 2: Justin O'Neill played his 50th game for the club.
 Finals Week 2: Kalyn Ponga made his NRL debut.
 Finals Week 2: Michael Morgan played his 100th game for the club.
 Finals Week 3: John Asiata played his 50th game for the club.

Squad List

Squad Movement

Gains

Losses

Re-signings

Ladder

Fixtures

NRL Auckland Nines

The NRL Auckland Nines is a pre-season rugby league nines competition featuring all 16 NRL clubs. The Cowboys, whose side featured a returning Matthew Bowen, finished first in their pool before being eliminated by the Melbourne Storm in the quarter finals.

Pool Play

Pre-season

Regular season

Finals

Statistics

Representatives
The following players have played a representative match in 2016.

Honours

League
Dally M Medal: Jason Taumalolo
Dally M Lock of the Year: Jason Taumalolo
Rugby League Players Association Player of the Year: Jason Taumalolo
NYC Team of the Year: Gideon Gela-Mosby, Kalyn Ponga, Brandon Smith

Club
Paul Bowman Medal: Jason Taumalolo
Players' Player: Jason Taumalolo
Member's Player of the Year: Jason Taumalolo
Club Person of the Year: John Asiata
Most Improved: Ethan Lowe  
Rookie of the Year: Javid Bowen
NYC Player of the Year: Brandon Smith
Townsville Bulletins' Fan Choice Award: Michael Morgan

Feeder Clubs

National Youth Competition
 North Queensland Cowboys - 2nd, lost preliminary final

Queensland Cup
 Mackay Cutters - 14th, missed finals
 Northern Pride - 8th, missed finals
 Townsville Blackhawks - 3rd, lost semi final

References

North Queensland Cowboys seasons
North Queensland Cowboys season